Glory of Heroes or GOH (Chinese: 勇士的荣耀; pinyin: yǒng shì de róng yào), is a Chinese kickboxing promotion developed by Beijing Wanmingyang Media. The events are streamed live on iQiyi and delay broadcast every Sunday at 22:00 on Shenzhen Television.

History

2016
Glory of Heroes by Wanmingyang Media was announced on February 18, 2016. The first Glory of Heroes event took place on April 2 in Shenzhen, China.

Glory of Heroes was started by former Wu Lin Feng announcer/producer Guo Chendong and the five first events aired live on Henan Television. Guo Chendong later left Henan TV and the promotions broadcast relationship with the channel ended. 

Another new line of events called “Rise of Heroes” started on September 17, 2016 in Chaoyang, Liaoning, China. It first broadcast on Beijing TV on October 13, 2016.

Glory of Heroes (勇士的荣耀) – Mostly kickboxing but also some MMA fights. Started in 2016. Events are streamed live and broadcast on tv delayed at later dates.

2017
Glory of Heroes crowned their first champions in a series of events in late 2017 and early 2018.

July 16, 2017, Glory of Heroes and Krush jointly organized a Japan VS China themed event, with contestants such as: Qiu Jianliang, Tie Yinghua, Deng Zeqi, Yun Qi, Hirotaka Urabe, HIROYA, Kosuke Komiyama, Makoto Uehara. 

Glory of Heroes 6: Genesis made the promotions debut on Shenzhen TV. Conquest of Heroes MMA events also started to broadcast weekly on Shenzhen TV.

Events

Champions

Current champions

GOH Junior Lightweight Championship
-67 kg (-147.7 lb)

GOH Featherweight Championship
-65 kg (-143.3 lb)

GOH Junior Featherweight Championship
-63 kg (-138.9 lb)

GOH Bantamweight Championship
-60 kg (-132.3 lb)

GOH Junior Bantamweight Championship
-57 kg (-125.7 lb)

Tournament champions

Notable fighters

  Filip Verlinden
  Alex Pereira
  Gabriel Varga
  Fang Bian
  Qiu Jianliang
  Wei Rui
  Xu Yan
  Yang Zhuo
  Yi Long
  Deng Zeqi
  Yun Qi
  Tie Yinghua
  Enriko Kehl
  Cedric Doumbe
  Dylan Salvador
  Fabio Pinca
  Raphaël Llodra
  Hirotaka Urabe
  Masahiro Yamamoto
  Yuichiro Nagashima
  Ilias Bulaid
  Jemyma Betrian
  Massaro Glunder
  Sergio Wielzen
  Israel Adesanya
  Bogdan Stoica
  Armin Pumpanmuang Windy Sport
  Jomthong Chuwattana
  Kaew Fairtex
  Kem Sitsongpeenong
  Manaowan Sitsongpeenong
  Petpanomrung Kiatmuu9
  Saiyok Pumpanmuang
  Singdam Kiatmuu9
  Sudsakorn Sor Klinmee
  Narong Bunchan

References

External links

Glory of Heroes videos on IQIYI
Glory of Heroes Weibo
Available on FITE

Kickboxing organizations
Kickboxing in China